Todd Branch is a stream in Clark County in the U.S. state of Missouri.

Todd Branch has the last name of a local country doctor.

See also
List of rivers of Missouri

References

Rivers of Clark County, Missouri
Rivers of Missouri